Eric R Holroyd (1916–2005) was a male athlete who competed for England.

Cycling career
Holroyd represented England in the cycling road race at the 1950 British Empire Games in Auckland, New Zealand.

Personal life
He was the first member of the team to arrive in Auckland because he wished to live in New Zealand and arrived under the assisted immigration scheme.

References

1916 births
2005 deaths
English male cyclists
Cyclists at the 1950 British Empire Games
Commonwealth Games competitors for England